Owensboro is a home rule-class city in and the county seat of Daviess County, Kentucky, United States. It is the fourth-largest city in the state by population. The 2020 census had its population at 60,183. The metropolitan population was estimated at 116,506. The metropolitan area is the sixth largest in the state as of 2018, and the seventh largest population center in the state when including micropolitan areas.

History
Evidence of Native American settlement in the area dates back 12,000 years. Following a series of failed uprisings with British support, however, the last Shawnee were forced to vacate the area before the end of the 18th century.

The first European descendant to settle in Owensboro was frontiersman William Smeathers or Smothers in 1797, for whom the riverfront park is named. The settlement was originally known as "Yellow Banks" from the color of the land beside the Ohio River. In 1817, Yellow Banks was formally established under the name Owensborough, named after Col. Abraham Owen. In 1893, the spelling of the name was shortened to its current Owensboro.

Several distillers, mainly of bourbon whiskey, have been in and around the city of Owensboro. The major distillery still in operation is the Glenmore Distillery Company, now owned by the Sazerac Company.

On August 14, 1936, downtown Owensboro was the site of the last public hanging in the United States. A 26 year old African American man, Rainey Bethea, was convicted and sentenced for the rape and murder of 70-year-old Lischa Edwards in a very short time (only 37 days lapsed between the crime and the execution). A carnival atmosphere was in place with vendors selling hotdogs, attended by a large crowd including children and many reporters. The execution was presided over by a female sheriff, Florence Shoemaker Thompson, who gained national media attention for her role in the process, although she declined to spring the trap. Before Bethea was dead, the crowd had already begun to tear at his clothes and even his body for souvenirs. The Kentucky General Assembly quickly abolished public executions after the embarrassment this caused.

The end of the Second World War brought civil engineering projects which helped turn Owensboro from a sleepy industrial town into a modern, expanding community by the turn of the 1960s. Many of the projects were set in motion by Johnson, Depp & Quisenberry, a firm of consulting engineers then engaged in a runway redesign at the County Airport; the "Depp" in question was a member of an old and prominent Kentucky family which includes the town's most famous son, actor Johnny Depp.

Manufacturing

As of 1903, Owensboro was home to several stemmeries.
Pinkerton Tobacco produced Red Man chewing tobacco in Owensboro. Swedish Match continues to make Red Man in a plant outside city limits.

The Owensboro Wagon Company, established in 1884, was one of the largest and most influential wagon companies in the nation. With eight styles or sizes of wagons, the company set the standard of quality at the turn of the 20th century.

Frederick A. Ames came to Owensboro from Washington, Pennsylvania, in 1887. He started the Carriage Woodstock Company to repair horse-drawn carriages. In 1910, he began to manufacture a line of automobiles under the Ames brand name. Ames hired industrialist Vincent Bendix in 1912, and the company became the Ames Motor Car Company. Despite its product being called the "best $1500" car by a Texas car dealer, the company ceased production of its own model in 1915. The company then began manufacturing replacement bodies for the more widely sold Ford Model T. In 1922, the company remade itself and started to manufacture furniture under the name Ames Corporation. The company finally sold out to Whitehall Furniture in 1970.

The start of the Kentucky Electrical Lamp Company, a light bulb manufacturing company was in 1899; it eventually was acquired by Kentucky Radio Company (Ken-Rad) in 1918 and later acquired by General Electric in 1945 and in 1987 acquired by MPD, Inc., created the light bulbs that illuminated the first night game in the history of Major League Baseball on May 24, 1935, between the Reds and Phillies at Cincinnati's Crosley Field. The Owensboro plant was a major part of General Electric's vacuum tube manufacturing operations, producing both receiving types and military/industrial ceramic types. In 1961, engineers at the General Electric plant in Owensboro introduced a family of vacuum tubes called the Compactron.

In June 1932, John G. Barnard founded the Modern Welding Company in a small building located near the Ohio River at First and Frederica Streets where the Bluegrass Music Hall of Fame and Museum sits today. Today, Modern Welding Company has nine steel tank and vessel fabrication subsidiaries located throughout the United States, and five welding supply stores located in Kentucky and Indiana. The company is the country's largest supplier of underground and above ground steel storage tanks for flammable and combustible liquids. The company celebrated its 75th anniversary in 2007.

Texas Gas Transmission Corporation was created in 1948 with the merger of Memphis Natural Gas Company and Kentucky Natural Gas Corporation and made its headquarters in Owensboro. Since that time, Texas Gas changed ownership four times. The company was bought by CSX Corp. in 1983, by Transco Energy Corp. in 1989, by Williams in 1995, and by Loews Corporation in 2003.

Geography

Climate
Owensboro has a humid subtropical climate which is characterized by hot, humid summers and moderately cold winters. Day-to-day temperature differences can be high during the winter. Summers, in comparison, are much more stable. Severe weather, including the threat of tornadoes, is not uncommon throughout much of the year, with several notable events occurring throughout the city's history. One such event occurred on December 9, 1952, when F3 tornado tore directly through the city, injuring three people.

Demographics

As of the census of 2010, there were 58,083 people and 23,380 households within the city. The population density was 2,999.1 people per square mile (1,198.4 per km2). The racial makeup of the city was 87.5% White, 7.3% African American, 0.9% Asian, 0.1% Native American, 0.01% Pacific Islander, 0.55% from other races, and 2.5% from two or more races. Hispanic or Latino of any race were 3.2% of the population.

There were 23,380 households, out of which 23.7% had children under the age of 18 living with them, 44.7% were married couples living together, 13.9% had a female householder with no husband present, and 37.8% were non-families. 33.3% of all households were made up of individuals, and 14.0% had someone living alone who was 65 years of age or older. The average household size was 2.29 and the average family size was 2.91.

In the city, the population was spread out, with 23.7% under the age of 18, 9.8% from 18 to 24, 27.4% from 25 to 44, 22.4% from 45 to 64, and 16.3% who were 65 years of age or older. The median age was 37 years. For every 100 females, there were 87.6 males. For every 100 females age 18 and over, there were 82.6 males.

The median income for a household in the city was $37,289, and the median income for a family was $41,333. Males had a median income of $33,429 versus $21,457 for females. The per capita income for the city was $21,183. About 12.2% of families and 18.4% of the population were below the poverty line, including 20.9% of those under age 18 and 12.4% of those age 65 or over.

Metropolitan area
According to the 2007 census, the Owensboro Metropolitan Area includes Daviess, Hancock, and McLean counties.

Economy

Top employers
 
According to Owensboro's 2021 Comprehensive Annual Financial Report, the top employers in the city were:

Arts and culture
Owensboro was named an All-American City in 2013. Owensboro placed fourth on Area Development's Top 20 Southern Cities, with a 9th-place ranking for its "recession busting factors" among the Top 25 Small Cities.

Religion
In 1937, Pope Pius XI established the Roman Catholic Diocese of Owensboro, which spans approximately the western third of the state. Though the area has been considered by many to be predominately Catholic, evangelical denominations such as Southern Baptists have increased dramatically over the past several decades. The Kentucky Baptist Convention has many churches in the area. Owensboro is also home to Temple Adath Israel, which is among the oldest synagogues in the United States.

Owensboro is also the location of Covenant Baptist Theological Seminary's campus.

Events

Owensboro is the "Barbecue Capital of the world"; it holds its International Bar-B-Q Festival and competition every second weekend in May.
Owensboro hosts "ROMP", "River of Music Party", a bluegrass music festival. ROMP has grown to 20,000 visitors a year, and won the Governor's Award for Community Arts in 2013.
Lanham Brothers Jamboree is an event held every second Saturday from April through September at the Diamond Lake Resort Theater in Owensboro.
During the summer, the city offers "Friday After 5", a free 16-week series of outdoor concerts on the downtown riverfront.
The "Owensboro PumpkinFest" is held each September at the Sportscenter/Moreland Park complex. The festival includes food vendors, crafts people, carnival rides, children and adult activities and games, and contests using pumpkins. The event was started by the Glenmary Sisters to raise awareness and funds.

Points of interest
 Ben Hawes Golf Course and Park
 Daviess County Public Library
 Owensboro Bridge
 International Bluegrass Music Museum
 Largest sassafras tree (located on Frederica Street next door to the Daviess County Public Library)
 Owensboro Museum of Science and History
 RiverPark Center
 Smothers Park
 Temple Adath Israel, one of the oldest synagogue buildings still standing in the United States
 Western Kentucky Botanical Garden
 William H. Natcher Bridge

Sports
The Owensboro Oilers baseball team compete in the collegiate wood-bat Ohio Valley League. The Oilers were the KIT League's 2008 playoff champions and the 2006 KIT League season champions. The team is named for the baseball minor league farm team "Owensboro Oilers" which existed in the 1940s.
Many of the city high schools produced talented college and professional athletes.

Government

Owensboro has operated under a City Manager form of government since 1954. Citizens elect a mayor and four city commissioners who form the Board of Commissioners. The Board of Commissioners is the legislative body of the city government and represents the interests of the citizens. The Board of Commissioners hires a city manager who administers the day-to-day operations of the city.

The mayor is elected for a term of four years. Each city commissioner is elected for a term of two years. The term of the city manager is indefinite and based on performance.

Education
The Owensboro Public Schools, Daviess County Public Schools, and the Diocese of Owensboro's Catholic School System oversee K-12 education in and around Owensboro.

Owensboro is home to two private, four-year colleges, Brescia University (Catholic) and Kentucky Wesleyan College, and one public community college, Owensboro Community and Technical College. A campus of Daymar College is also located in Owensboro, and Western Kentucky University has a regional campus there.

In 2006, plans were announced for a research center operated by the University of Louisville to be located at the Mitchell Memorial Cancer Center, a part of the Owensboro Medical Health System, to study how to make the first ever human papilloma virus vaccine, called Gardasil, from tobacco plants. U of L researcher Dr Albert Bennet Jenson and Dr Shin-je Ghim discovered the vaccine in 2006. If successful, the vaccine would be made in Owensboro.

Owensboro has a lending library, the Daviess County Public Library.

Media
The daily newspaper is the Messenger-Inquirer, owned by Paxton Media Group of Paducah, Kentucky.

The Owensboro Times is a local online news site.

Radio stations include WBIO, WXCM, WLME, WOMI, WVJS and WBKR broadcasting from Owensboro. One, WSTO-FM, is actually licensed to Owensboro, although its studios are now located in Evansville.

Although no television stations are based in the city, it is part of the Evansville television market, which is the 100th-largest in the United States, according to Nielsen Media Research. However, in early 2007, WFIE-TV opened a bureau in Owensboro which covers news on the Kentucky side of the market. Many of the local television stations often promote themselves as serving Evansville, Indiana, Owensboro, Kentucky, and Henderson, Kentucky.

Infrastructure

Transportation
I-165, US 60, and US 431 serve Owensboro, with US 431 terminating at the former US 60 Bypass (now signed US 60). US 231 and US 60 form a partial beltway around Owensboro. KY 81, KY 56, KY 331, KY 298, KY 54, and KY 144 also serve the city.

Owensboro-Daviess County Regional Airport serves, along with Evansville Regional Airport, as one of the region's primary commercial airports.

The Owensboro Transit System (OTS) offers bus transit to residents, and the Green River Intra-County Transit System (GRITS) offers specialized bus services to residents with disabilities who are not able to ride fixed-route public transportation buses.

Notable people

Politicians
 W. Ralph Basham, former director of the United States Secret Service
 Wendell H. Ford, former Kentucky governor and U.S. senator
 Steve Henry, former lieutenant governor of Kentucky
 Albert S. Marks, former governor of Tennessee
 Suzanne Miles, member of the Kentucky House of Representatives from the 7th District
 Wilbur Kingsbury Miller, federal judge
 William Rosenbaum, member of the Arizona House of Representatives
 John M. Spalding, World War II hero, politician

Sports
 Chris Brown (defensive back), former NFL player
 Bruce Brubaker, former Major League Baseball player
 Vince Buck, NFL player
 Rex Chapman, former NBA player
 Wayne Chapman, former NBA and ABA player
 David Green, Jeff Green and Mark Green, NASCAR drivers
 Cliff Hagan, former NBA player
 Nicky Hayden, motorcycle racer, 2006 MotoGP champion
 Roger Lee Hayden, motorcycle racer
 Tommy Hayden, motorcycle racer
 Kenny Higgs, former NBA player
 Mark Higgs, former NFL player
 Jeff Jones, collegiate basketball coach
 Tommy Kron, professional basketball player
 Jeremy Mayfield, former NASCAR driver
 Justin Miller, NFL player
 Eugene Oberst, Olympic bronze medalist in the javelin throw
 Bo Smith, Canadian Football League cornerback
 Larry Vanover, MLB umpire
 Nick Varner, pool champion
 Darrell Waltrip, three-time NASCAR champion and Hall of Fame inductee; FOX sports commentator
 Michael Waltrip, retired NASCAR driver/team owner and FOX sports commentator
 Dave Watkins, Major League Baseball player
 Bobby Watson, former NBA player
 B. J. Whitmer, professional wrestler
 Brad Wilkerson, MLB player
 Ken Willis, former NFL player

Entertainers
 Johnny Depp, actor, director, musician
 Jon Brennan, country music artist, reality TV star  MTV "The Real World"
 Tom Ewell, actor
 Florence Henderson, actress, singer,  most notable of The Brady Bunch fame
 Kevin Olusola, musician, beatboxer for Pentatonix
 Tom Powers, actor
 Christine Johnson Smith, opera singer and Tony Award-nominated Broadway actress
 Mark Stuart, vocalist for Audio Adrenaline
 William Booth Wecker, showman of the 1930s and 1940s

Authors and journalists
 Terry Bisson, author
 Kody Keplinger, author
 Stephen F. Cohen, Russian studies scholar
 Craig Crawford, political commentator
 Jesse Edward Grinstead author of Western fiction
 Marcus Rediker, historian and activist
 Moneta Sleet, Jr., Pulitzer Prize-winning photographer

Others
 Beulah Annan, suspected murderer
 Thomas Cruse, U.S. Army brigadier general who was a recipient of the Medal of Honor
 Hazen A. Dean, noted Boy Scouts of America member and Scoutmaster
 Dudley W. Morton, U.S. naval commander
 David Paul Nash,  Vietnam War Medal Of Honor recipient 
 David Sharpe, American painter

Sister cities
Owensboro has two sister cities, as designated by Sister Cities International:

 Olomouc, Moravia, Czech Republic
 Nisshin, Aichi, Japan

See also

List of cities and towns along the Ohio River
Union Station (Owensboro, Kentucky)

References

External links

 City of Owensboro official website
 Entry about Owensboro from the Kentucky Atlas and Gazetteer, a University of Kentucky website
 1821 Advertisement for an auction for land around Owensboro, Kentucky, from the Library of Congress

 
Populated places established in 1797
Cities in Daviess County, Kentucky
Cities in Kentucky
County seats in Kentucky
Owensboro metropolitan area
Kentucky populated places on the Ohio River